Mira is a feminine given name with varying meanings. In the Romance languages, it is related to the Latin words for 'wonder' and 'wonderful'. In South Slavic languages, it means 'peace' and is often used as part of a longer name, such as Miroslava (masculine form: Miroslav), Mirjana, or Sławomira (masculine form: Sławomir). In Albanian, it means 'goodness' or 'kindness'. In Sanskrit, it means 'ocean', 'sea', 'limit', or 'boundary'. It is sometimes also a short form of other given names.

People with the given name include:
Mira Aroyo (born 1977), Bulgarian musician
Mira Awad (born 1975), Palestinian-Arab actress and musician
Mira Bai or Meera (1498–1547), Hindu mystical singer and poet
Mira Bellwether (born 1981/1982), author of the 'zine Fucking Trans Women
Mirjana Mira Banjac (born 1929), Serbian actress
Mira Craig (born 1982), Norwegian rhythm and blues singer and songwriter
Mira Dancy (born 1979), American painter
Míra Emberovics (born 1988), Hungarian handball player
Mira Furlan (born 1955), Croatian actress and singer
Mira Gojak (born 1963), Australian artist
Mira Golubović (born 1976), Serbian retired volleyball player
Mira Gonzalez (born 1992), American poet
Mira Hoteit (born 2002), Lebanese footballer
Mira Konçi (born 1973), Albanian singer and songwriter
Mira Kunnasluoto (born 1974), Finnish singer
Mira Kuś (born 1958), Polish poet and journalist
Mira Lehr (1934–2023), American multimedia artist
Mira Lesmana (born 1964), Indonesian songwriter, film director and producer
Mira Leung (born 1989), Canadian retired figure skater
Mira Mihelič (1912-1985), Slovene writer and translator
Mira Nair (born 1957), Indian-American film director
Mira Nakashima (born 1942), Japanese-American architect and furniture maker
Mira Petrović (born 1956), Serbian politician
Mira Sorvino (born 1967), American actress
Mira Stupica (1923–2016), Serbian actress
Mira Topić (born 1983), Croatian volleyball player
Mira W. (Widjaja) (born 1951), Indonesian author
Mira Zimińska (1901-1997), Polish actress

Fictional characters
 Mira (ミラ), a character from She Professed Herself Pupil of the Wise Man
, a character from the anime Godannar
, a character from the manga series Magi: The Labyrinth of Magic
, a character from the anime Sekkō Boys
, a character from the manga series Koisuru Asteroid
Mira Nova, a character from Buzz Lightyear of Star Command: The Adventure Begins and Buzz Lightyear of Star Command
, a character from Trinity Seven
, a character from the manga series Dimension W
 Mira, a character from Animal Crossing: New Leaf
 Mira (Encantadia), a character in the video game Encantadia
 Mira, a character in The Last Legion
 Mira, title character of the Disney Jr video series Mira, Royal Detective
 Mira (Star Wars), a character in Star Wars: Knights of the Old Republic II: The Sith Lords
 Mira, a character from the video game Zero Time Dilemma

See also 
 Mirah (born 1974), American musician
 Mir (title)
 Mira
 Daihatsu Mira
 MIRA Ltd.

References

Arabic feminine given names
Belarusian feminine given names
Bosnian feminine given names
Bulgarian feminine given names
Croatian feminine given names
Czech feminine given names
English feminine given names
Hebrew feminine given names
Indian feminine given names
Japanese feminine given names
Latin feminine given names
Macedonian feminine given names
Montenegrin feminine given names
Pakistani feminine given names
Polish feminine given names
Serbian feminine given names
Slavic feminine given names
Slovak feminine given names
Slovene feminine given names
Ukrainian feminine given names